Gryllus fultoni, the southern wood cricket, is a species of cricket in the subfamily Gryllinae. It is found in North America.

References

fultoni
Articles created by Qbugbot
Insects described in 1957